HMNZS Rotoiti was a Lake-class inshore patrol vessel of the Royal New Zealand Navy. These boats perform border and fishery protection patrols.

She was fitted out in Whangarei and on 20 November 2007 started contractor sea trials. After delays due to problems with gear and fittings, she was commissioned on 17 April 2009, and arrived at the Devonport Naval Base for the first time on 24 April 2009. HMNZS Rotoiti was the first of her class to be commissioned in the Royal New Zealand Navy.

Rotoiti was the third boat of this name to serve in the Royal New Zealand Navy and is named after Lake Rotoiti.

Rotoiti was decommissioned at Devonport Naval Base on 17 October 2019. Regulatory changes in 2012 resulted in operating restrictions around speed and sea states being imposed on them. Subsequently, the RNZN assessed them as no longer being suited to the heavy seas typically encountered off New Zealand and further afield, for which Protector-class offshore patrol vessels were more suited.

In 2022, Rotoiti, along with her sister , was sold to Ireland for use by the Irish Naval Service.

See also
 Patrol boats of the Royal New Zealand Navy

References

External links

 Official web page

Protector-class inshore patrol vessels
Patrol vessels of New Zealand
2007 ships